Pansy Methodist Church is a historic church at Pansy in Clinton County, Ohio, United States.  Built in 1885, it was formerly home to a congregation of the Methodist Episcopal Church.  Few changes have been made to the church or to its adjacent church school since they were built: neither building has any central heating or plumbing, and the interiors retain the open, undivided floor plans with which they were designed.

Built in 1885 and 1900 respectively, the church and school are a mix of architectural styles. A small tower with a belfry sits atop the roof at the front of the church; it is decorated with ornate latticework. Nearby, the school measures ; its Romanesque Revival style is evidenced by elements such as pilasters on the corners and decorative brickwork below the roofline. Both buildings are constructed of brick on stone foundations and feature slate roofs.

In 1973, the church and school were designated a historic district and listed on the National Register of Historic Places, due to their historically significant architecture.  Key to this designation was their place as a rare example of the nineteenth-century country church; they were seen as evoking a sense of historic rural Christianity in the region.

References

Churches completed in 1885
19th-century Methodist church buildings in the United States
Buildings and structures in Clinton County, Ohio
National Register of Historic Places in Clinton County, Ohio
Defunct Christian schools
Defunct schools in Ohio
Former school buildings in the United States
Gothic Revival church buildings in Ohio
Methodist churches in Ohio
Methodist schools in the United States
Romanesque Revival architecture in Ohio 
Churches on the National Register of Historic Places in Ohio
School buildings on the National Register of Historic Places in Ohio
Historic districts on the National Register of Historic Places in Ohio
Christian schools in Ohio